Robert "Bob" Beardmore (born 21 June 1960) is an English former professional rugby league footballer who played in the 1970s, 1980s and 1990s. He played at club level for Castleford (Heritage № 608) and Leigh (Heritage No. 999), as a goal-kicking , i.e. number 7.

Background
Bob Beardmore's birth was registered in Pontefract district, West Riding of Yorkshire, England.

Playing career

Challenge Cup Final appearances
Bob Beardmore played , scored a try, and a drop goal, and won the Lance Todd Trophy in Castleford's 15–14 victory over Hull Kingston Rovers in the 1986 Challenge Cup Final during the 1985–86 season at Wembley Stadium, London on Saturday 3 May 1986.

County Cup Final appearances
Bob Beardmore played  in Castleford's 10–5 victory over Bradford Northern in the 1981 Yorkshire County Cup Final during the 1981–82 season at Headingley Rugby Stadium, Leeds on Saturday 3 October 1981, played , and scored a goal in the 2–13 defeat by Hull F.C. in the 1983 Yorkshire County Cup Final during the 1983–84 season at Elland Road, Leeds on Saturday 15 October 1983, played , and scored a try, and 2-goals in the 18–22 defeat by Hull Kingston Rovers in the 1985 Yorkshire County Cup Final during the 1985–86 season at Elland Road, Leeds on Sunday 27 October 1985, played , and scored a drop goal in the 31–24 victory over Hull F.C. in the 1986 Yorkshire County Cup Final during the 1986–87 season at Headingley Rugby Stadium, Leeds on Saturday 11 October 1986, played as an interchange/substitute, i.e. number 14, (replacing  Alan Shillito) in the 12–12 draw with Bradford Northern in the 1987 Yorkshire County Cup Final during the 1987–88 season at Headingley Rugby Stadium, Leeds on Saturday 17 October 1987, played  in the 2–11 defeat by Bradford Northern in the 1987 Yorkshire County Cup Final replay during the 1987–88 season at Elland Road, Leeds on Saturday 31 October 1987, and played , in the 12–33 defeat by Leeds in the 1988 Yorkshire County Cup Final during the 1988–89 season at Elland Road, Leeds on Sunday 16 October 1988.

Testimonial match
Bob Beardmore's Testimonial match at Castleford took place in 1988.

Career records
Bob Beardmore's holds Castleford's "Most Points in a Season" record with 334-points scored in the 1983–84 season.

Honoured at Castleford Tigers
Bob Beardmore is a Tigers Hall Of Fame Inductee.

Genealogical information
Bob Beardmore is the twin brother of the rugby league footballer, Kevin Beardmore, and the younger brother of Kenneth Beardmore, and Janet Beardmore.

References

External links

Photograph "Castleford scrum-half Bob Beardmore in action in October 1988" at wakefieldmuseumcollections.org.uk

1960 births
Living people
Castleford Tigers players
English rugby league players
Lance Todd Trophy winners
Leigh Leopards captains
Leigh Leopards players
Rugby league hookers
Rugby league players from Pontefract
Rugby league props
English twins
Twin sportspeople
Yorkshire rugby league team players